Devil's Slide is an unusual cliff rock formation on the side of Cinnabar Mountain located in Gallatin National Forest in Park County, Montana north of Yellowstone National Park.  This distinctive formation can be viewed from Highway 89 and was created from alternate beds of limestone, sandstone, quartzites that have been tilted to lie nearly vertical and have eroded at different rates.

History
In 1871, very few white travellers had ventured this far south in the Yellowstone River valley.  The Cook–Folsom–Peterson Expedition passed the Devil's Slide in 1869.  Cook and Folsom described the slide in their diaries but did not name them

In August 1870, the Washburn–Langford–Doane Expedition observed the formation and named it The Devil's Slide.  Langford described the formation in his Wonders of the Yellowstone published in the May 1871 edition of Scribner's Monthly:

Notes

Landforms of Park County, Montana
Rock formations of Montana